Mutab Asiri  (born 22 November 1987) is a Saudi Arabian footballer who plays as a goalkeeper.  
He joined Al-Nasr in the Winter of 2012, having left the Abha FC.

Career
At the club level, Mutab Asiri played for Riyadh.

Honours

Clubs
Al-Nassr
Saudi Professional League 2013–14
Saudi Crown Prince Cup: 2013–14

References

1987 births
Living people
Saudi Arabian footballers
Abha Club players
Al Nassr FC players
Hetten FC players
Al-Hazem F.C. players
Saudi First Division League players
Saudi Second Division players
Saudi Professional League players
Association football goalkeepers